Bandar Tun Abdul Razak is a settlement town located in Rompin District, Pahang, Malaysia. This town located 27 kilometres from Bandar Muadzam Shah and 127 kilometres from Kuantan, the capital city of Pahang State. The town is strategically situated between Johor Bahru and Kuantan, where the Tun Razak Highway as the main road that connected this both town. This town is named after the second Prime Minister of Malaysia, Tun Abdul Razak.

History
Bandar Tun Abdul Razak was opened in 1979 and in the early years, the town was known as Bandar 22 due to the government plan to name the areas around the south east Pahang that will become the future local administration and economic centre using a number for temporary purpose. Depending on the perceived potential of a town, the government changes the town's name from a number into a proper name.

Residential
Bandar Tun Abdul Razak is surrounded by a few FELDA settlements, traditional village of Orang Asli, plantation quarters and other residential area.

FELDA settlements in Bandar Tun Abdul Razak:

Felda Keratong 1
Felda Keratong 2
Felda Keratong 3
Felda Keratong 4
Felda Keratong 5

Bandar Tun Razak is home for 20,000 peoples (estimate), with the Malay formed the majority and a small numbers of Indian, Chinese and Orang Asli.

Infrastructure
Although Bandar Tun Abdul Razak is a small town, the infrastructure of the town are mostly complete. There are a school, post office, police station, medical clinic, bus station, mosque, bank, restaurant, grocery shop, hair saloon, mini market, cyber cafe, book shop and others.

For recreation, there a multi-purpose hall, complete with badminton and takraw court, and also a small sport complex for outdoor sport likes football, netball, volleyball and athletic.

Education

Primary schools
 SK Keratong 1
 SK Keratong 2
 SK Keratong 3
 SK Keratong 4
 SK Bandar Tun Abdul Razak
 SK Melati
 SK Ladang Kota Bahagia

Secondary schools
 SMK Keratong
 SMK Bandar Tun Abdul Razak
 SMA al-Hasanah

Politics

References

Rompin District
Towns in Pahang